Bernardo Tinedo Belasco (died 25 August 1907) was the president of the Venezuelan state of Zulia in 1880 and 1881, the combined state of Falcón Zulia in 1884, and the State of Falcón in 1886.

In 1878, Belasco helped establish a music school. He was also a general.

See also
List of Presidents and Governors of Zulia

References

1907 deaths
Year of birth missing
Place of birth missing
Place of death missing
Politicians from Zulia
19th-century Venezuelan people
People from Falcón
Founders of academic institutions
Venezuelan generals
School founders